Alligator Pond is a fishing village on the southwestern coast of Jamaica in the parish of Manchester.

Unlike the tourist-oriented coasts in the northern part of the country, Alligator Pond's shoreline is as much about work as play; here fishermen launch their boats to catch some of the island's best-regarded fish while women conduct the wholesale business of the catch. Weather-worn cookshops and bars line the sand's edge, supplying food staples such as curried goat and Red Stripe beer.

Geography

Alligator Pond lies at the foot of the Don Figueroa Mountains to the north-east, some 35 km from Mandeville. The name is said by locals to derive from the shape of the mountain range, which viewed from the beach has bumps which suggest an alligator's back.

The Alligator Pond River is a bathing spot about 3.2 km (2 miles) west of the village off the road leading to Port Kaiser.

The Little Ochie

The Little Ochie, a fish restaurant, is located in several huts on the beach, some made from the hulls of fishing boats with thatched roofs. It has expanded to seat several hundred and attracts a clientele from far and wide, including some tourist tours.

See also

 List of cities and towns in Jamaica
 List of beaches in Jamaica

References

External links 
 Photo essay on life in Alligator Pond, Jamaica

Populated coastal places in Jamaica
Beaches of Jamaica
Populated places in Saint Elizabeth Parish
Year of establishment missing